Marc Diakiese (born 16 March 1993) is a Congolese-born English professional mixed martial artist who competes as a lightweight for the Ultimate Fighting Championship. He has also competed for Caged Steel and BAMMA.

Background 

Aged 17, Diakiese began training in mixed martial arts to keep fit and stay out of trouble. Before turning professional, he worked as a railway engineer. Diakiese was also a promising footballer before committing to mixed martial arts.

Mixed martial arts career

Early career
As an amateur, Diakiese went 9–0 and simultaneously held three different titles. He turned professional in 2013 after struggling to find willing opponents.

BAMMA
After four wins in under a year in regional promotions, Diakiese joined BAMMA on a five-fight contract in 2014. In September, he made his promotional debut against Jefferson George at BAMMA 16 and won the fight by unanimous decision. In December, he beat Vernon O'Neill via unanimous decision at BAMMA 17.

In March 2015, Diakiese faced Jack McGann at BAMMA 19 for the vacant Lightweight Championship. He won the fight by unanimous decision. In September, he defended his title at BAMMA 22 with a knockout 24 seconds into the first round against Rick Selvarajah. In February 2016, Diakiese signed a new deal with the promotion.

Three months later, he successfully decided his title for a second time with another first round knockout. Diakiese finished Kane Mousah in 36 seconds at BAMMA 25 and subsequently earned a UFC contract.

Ultimate Fighting Championship
Diakiese made his UFC debut against Lukasz Sajewski on October 8, 2016 at UFC 204. After being smothered by his opponent in the first round, Diakiese came back to win the fight by TKO due to knees and punches near the end of the second round.

Diakiese returned to face Frankie Perez on December 9, 2016 at UFC Fight Night: Lewis vs. Abdurakhimov. Despite losing the second round, Diakiese would go on to win the bout by unanimous decision.

Diakiese faced Teemu Packalén on March 18, 2017 at UFC Fight Night: Manuwa vs. Anderson. Diakiese defeated Packalén via knockout, 30 seconds into the first round. The win earned Diakiese his first Performance of the Night bonus.

Diakiese faced Drakkar Klose on July 7, 2017 at The Ultimate Fighter 25 Finale. He lost the fight by split decision.

Diakiese faced Dan Hooker on December 30, 2017 at UFC 219. He lost the fight via guillotine choke submission in the third round.

Diakiese faced Nasrat Haqparast on July 22, 2018 at UFC Fight Night 134. He lost the fight via unanimous decision after being knocked down multiple times during the bout.

Diakiese faced Joseph Duffy on March 16, 2019 at UFC Fight Night 147. He won the fight by unanimous decision.

In May 2019, Diakese revealed on his social media that he had signed a new, multi-fight contract with the UFC.

Diakiese faced Lando Vannata on September 28, 2019 at UFC on ESPN+ 18. He won the fight via unanimous decision.

Diakiese was scheduled to face Stevie Ray on March 21, 2020 at UFC Fight Night: Woodley vs. Edwards. However, Ray was removed from the card late-January for undisclosed reasons. Diakiese was expected to remain on the card against promotional newcomer Jai Herbert.  Due to the COVID-19 pandemic, the event was eventually postponed . Instead Diakiese was scheduled to face Alan Patrick on July 19, 2020  at UFC Fight Night 172.  However, on June 14, Patrick withdrew from the event for unknown reason and he was replaced by Rafael Fiziev. He lost the fight via unanimous decision. This fight earned him the Fight of the Night award.

Diakiese was scheduled to face Rafael Alves on  September 4, 2021 at UFC Fight Night 191. However, Alves pulled out of the fight in mid-August for undisclosed reasons and in turn, Diakiese was removed from the card as well. In turn, the pair was rescheduled at UFC Fight Night 197 on November 13, 2021. Diakiese lost the bout via guillotine choke submission in the first round.

Diakiese faced Viacheslav Borshchev on March 26, 2022 at UFC on ESPN 33. He won the fight by unanimous decision after controlling Borshchev on the ground for nearly twelve and a half minutes.

As the first bout of his new four-fight contract, Diakiese faced Damir Hadžović on July 23, 2022, at UFC Fight Night 208. He won the fight by unanimous decision.

Diakiese faced Michael Johnson on December 3, 2022, at UFC on ESPN 42. He lost the bout via unanimous decision.

Personal life 
Diakiese has two children, a son named Junior and a daughter named Matilda,a brother named Joel and with his fiancée. In 2017, he became the first UFC fighter to pose for Gay Times, an LGBT publication.

Championships and accomplishments

Mixed martial arts
Ultimate Fighting Championship
Performance of the Night (One time) 
Fight of the Night (One time) 
BAMMA
BAMMA Lonsdale British Lightweight Championship (One time)
Two successful title defenses
Cage Kumite
Cage Kumite Lightweight Championship (One time)
MMA Total Combat
MMATC Lightweight Championship (One time)
MMADNA.nl
2016 European Newcomer of the Year.

Mixed martial arts record

|-
|Loss
|align=center|16–6
|Michael Johnson
|Decision (unanimous)
|UFC on ESPN: Thompson vs. Holland
|
|align=center|3
|align=center|5:00
|Orlando, Florida, United States
|
|-
|Win
|align=center|16–5
|Damir Hadžović
|Decision (unanimous)
|UFC Fight Night: Blaydes vs. Aspinall 
|
|align=center|3
|align=center|5:00
|London, England
|
|-
|Win
|align=center|15–5
|Viacheslav Borschev
|Decision (unanimous)
|UFC on ESPN: Blaydes vs. Daukaus
|
|align=center|3
|align=center|5:00
|Columbus, Ohio, United States
|
|-
|Loss
|align=center|14–5
|Rafael Alves
|Submission (guillotine choke)
|UFC Fight Night: Holloway vs. Rodríguez
|
|align=center|1
|align=center|1:48
|Las Vegas, Nevada, United States
|
|-
|Loss
|align=center|14–4
|Rafael Fiziev
|Decision (unanimous)
|UFC Fight Night: Figueiredo vs. Benavidez 2
|
|align=center|3
|align=center|5:00
|Abu Dhabi, United Arab Emirates
|
|-
|Win
|align=center|14–3
|Lando Vannata
|Decision (unanimous)
|UFC Fight Night: Hermansson vs. Cannonier
|
|align=center|3
|align=center|5:00
|Copenhagen, Denmark
|
|-
|Win
|align=center|13–3
|Joseph Duffy
|Decision (unanimous)
|UFC Fight Night: Till vs. Masvidal
|
|align=center|3
|align=center|5:00
|London, England
|
|-
|Loss
|align=center|12–3
|Nasrat Haqparast
|Decision (unanimous)
|UFC Fight Night: Shogun vs. Smith
|
|align=center|3
|align=center|5:00
|Hamburg, Germany
|
|-
|Loss
|align=center|12–2
|Dan Hooker
|Submission (guillotine choke)
|UFC 219
|
|align=center|3
|align=center|0:42
|Las Vegas, Nevada, United States
|
|-
|Loss
|align=center|12–1
|Drakkar Klose
|Decision (split)
|The Ultimate Fighter: Redemption Finale
|
|align=center|3
|align=center|5:00
|Las Vegas, Nevada, United States
|
|-
|Win
|align=center|12–0
|Teemu Packalén
|KO (punch)
|UFC Fight Night: Manuwa vs. Anderson
|
|align=center|1
|align=center|0:30
|London, England
|
|-
|Win
|align=center|11–0
|Frankie Perez
|Decision (unanimous)
|UFC Fight Night: Lewis vs. Abdurakhimov
|
|align=center|3
|align=center|5:00
|Albany, New York, United States
|
|-
|Win
|align=center|10–0
|Łukasz Sajewski
|TKO (knees and punches)
|UFC 204
|
|align=center|2
|align=center|4:40
|Manchester, England 
|
|-
|Win
|align=center|9–0
|Kane Mousah
|KO (punch)
|BAMMA 25
|
|align=center|1
|align=center|0:36
|Birmingham, England
|
|-
|Win
|align=center|8–0
|Rick Selvarajah
|KO (punch)
|BAMMA 22
|
|align=center|1
|align=center|0:24
|Dublin, Ireland
|
|-
|Win
|align=center|7–0
|Jack McGann
|Decision (unanimous)
|BAMMA 19
|
|align=center|3
|align=center|5:00
|Blackpool, England
|
|-
|Win
|align=center|6–0
|Vernon O'Neil
|Decision (unanimous)
|BAMMA 17
|
|align=center|3
|align=center|5:00
|Manchester, England
|
|-
|Win
|align=center|5–0
|Jefferson George
|Decision (unanimous)
|BAMMA 16
|
|align=center|3
|align=center|5:00
|Manchester, England
|
|-
|Win
|align=center|4–0
|Danny Welsh
|Submission (rear-naked choke)
|CSFC 8
|
|align=center|1
|align=center|2:16
|Doncaster, England
|
|-
|Win
|align=center|3–0
|Jakob Grzegorzek
|Decision (unanimous)
|CSFC 7
|
|align=center|3
|align=center|5:00
|Doncaster, England
|
|-
|Win
|align=center|2–0
|Tom Earnshaw
|TKO (punches)
|Cage Kumite 2
|
|align=center|1
|align=center|4:52
|Barnsley, England
|
|-
|Win
|align=center|1–0
|Harris Neofytou
|TKO (punches)
|MMA Total Combat 55
|
|align=center|1
|align=center|1:27
|Spennymoor, England
|
|-

References

External links
 
 

1993 births
Living people
English male mixed martial artists
English practitioners of Brazilian jiu-jitsu
Lightweight mixed martial artists
Mixed martial artists utilizing Brazilian jiu-jitsu
English sportspeople of Democratic Republic of the Congo descent
Democratic Republic of the Congo emigrants to England
Democratic Republic of the Congo male mixed martial artists
Democratic Republic of the Congo practitioners of Brazilian jiu-jitsu
People from Kinshasa
Ultimate Fighting Championship male fighters